The following is a list of bishops of the Catholic Church in Australia. The Australian Catholic Church comprises seven archdioceses and 32 dioceses including six dioceses which cover the whole country: one each for those who belong to the Chaldean, Maronite, Melkite, Syro-Malabar and Ukrainian rites and one for those serving in the Australian Defence Forces. There is also a personal ordinariate for former Anglicans which has a similar status to a diocese. The church in Australia has five provinces: Adelaide, Brisbane, Melbourne, Perth and Sydney.

Each diocese is divided into an ecclesiastical province.  Each province has a metropolitan archdiocese led by an archbishop, and at least one suffragan diocese.

The Chaldean, Maronite, Melkite, Syro-Malabar and Ukrainian rites are governed by an eparchy, an ecclesiastical unit in Eastern Christianity, that is equivalent to a diocese. All eparchies in Australia are immediately subject to the Holy See with the exception of the Ukrainian Eparchy of Ss Peter and Paul which falls under the authority of the Archdiocese of Melbourne, as a suffragan in the ecclesiastical province of the metropolitan Archbishop of Melbourne.

Latin Church bishops

Immediately Subject to the Holy See
The following dioceses do not fall directly under an Ecclesiastical Province, although may be associated with one, and are immediately subject to the Holy See.

Bishops emeriti

Eastern Catholic Eparchs

Ukrainian Catholic Eparchy of Saints Peter and Paul of Melbourne

The Eparchy of Saints Peter and Paul of Melbourne is a suffragan in the ecclesiastical province of the metropolitan Archbishop of Melbourne, a Latin Church territory.

Eastern Catholic eparchs whose eparchies are immediately subject to the Holy See

The other Eastern Catholic Churches with eparchies (dioceses) or exarchates established in Australia are not grouped into provinces although may be associated with them. All are immediately subject to the Holy See, with limited oversight by the head of their respective sui iuris churches.

Eparchs emeriti

Personal Ordinariate of Our Lady of the Southern Cross

Australian bishops serving outside Australia

Bishops serving in Vatican City
 George Pell, former prefect of the Secretariat for the Economy (2014 to 2019), died 2023

Non-Australian bishops serving in Australia
 Charles Balvo, Apostolic Nunciature to Australia

References

Australia